List of Churches  in the Archdiocese of Harare. There is a total of 59 parishes across 10 Deanery's. The Youngest Parish is St Stephens Dzivarasekwa becoming a fully fledged parish in January 2019.

Inner City Deanery 
Parishes located in Inner City Deanery of Harare Archdiocese .

Inner City Deanery also has a famous choir called  Inner City Deanery Choir.

North West Of City Deanery 
Parishes located in North West of City Deanery. North West was separated from South West of City Deanery. North West of City Deanery choir is formerly known as South West 2 choir as well.

South West Of City Deanery 
Parishes located in South West of City Deanery . Holy Cross Budiriro the largest parish in the Archdiocese of Harare is in this deanery. South West of City Deanery is another famous choir

Outer City Deanery 
Parishes located in Outer City Deanery of Harare Archdiocese .

South East of City Deanery 
Parishes located in South East Deanery of Harare Archdiocese .

Chitungwiza Deanery 
Parishes located in Chitungwiza Deanery of Harare Archdiocese .

East Deanery 
Parishes located in East Deanery of Harare Archdiocese .

North Deanery 
Parishes located in North Deanery of Harare Archdiocese .

West Deanery 
Parishes located in West Deanery of Harare Archdiocese .

Marondera Deanery 
Parishes located in Marondera Deanery of Harare Archdiocese .

Chivhu Deanery
Parishes located in Chivhu Deanery

References

Religion in Zimbabwe
Diocese Of Catholic Zimbabwe